KRRQ (95.5 FM branded as Q-95-5) is a radio station serving the Lafayette metropolitan area with an urban contemporary format. It is under ownership of Cumulus Media.  Its studios are located on Galbert Road in Lafayette, and its transmitter is located southeast of Church Point, Louisiana.

KRRQ first signed on March 1, 1996, with a Contemporary Hip Hop and R&B format, owned by Citywide Communications. Citywide was later bought by Citadel Broadcasting, which merged with Cumulus Media in 2011. They are very well known for their 48-hour live Christmas special, donated to Africa.

References

External links
Q-95.5 - Official website

RRQ
Urban contemporary radio stations in the United States
Radio stations established in 1996
Cumulus Media radio stations